Jrashen or Jrashen may refer to:

Jrashen, Lori, Armenia
Jrashen, Ararat, Armenia
Jrashen, Armavir, Armenia
Verin Jrashen, Armenia